Granatiere was the name of at least three ships of the Italian Navy and may refer to:

 , a  launched in 1906 and discarded in 1927.
 , a  launched in 1938 and stricken in 1958.
 Italian frigate Granatiere (F 585), a Soldati-class frigate launched in 1985 and decommissioned in 2015.

Italian Navy ship names